Arthur Jacob Nature Reserve is a   Local Nature Reserve in Horton in Berkshire. It is owned and managed by the Royal Borough of Windsor and Maidenhead.

The reserve has four former gravel pits which have been converted from derelict land into lagoons managed for wildlife. There are several islands and the site has been planted with trees and shrubs, while some areas have been turned into wildflower meadows.

References

Local Nature Reserves in Berkshire